Bob Doyle may refer to:

 Bob Doyle (activist) (1916–2009), activist, World War II veteran and Irish member of the International Brigades during the Spanish Civil War
 Bob Doyle (politician), member of the Ohio House of Representatives, 1983–1992
 Bob Doyle (rugby league) (born 1944), Australian rugby player

See also
Robert Doyle (disambiguation)
Bobby Doyle (disambiguation)